Edward Michael Bishop (born 28 November 1961) is an English former professional footballer who played as a midfielder. He played in the Football League in England for Tranmere Rovers, Chester City and Crewe Alexandra and also played and managed in non-league football. He is the elder brother of comedian John Bishop.

Playing career
Bishop was born in Liverpool and began his career playing non-league football. He was with Nantwich Town and Winsford United before beginning the first of three spells with Northwich Victoria in 1984–85. He later had a spell with Altrincham before a brief stint with Runcorn prompted Tranmere Rovers to give Bishop his professional chance at the age of 25 in March 1988.

He returned to Northwich on loan in August 1988 but was quickly back with Rovers, making 35 league appearances during their Division Four promotion season. The following season saw Bishop appear at Wembley Stadium as a substitute in the Division Three play-off final against Notts County, which Tranmere lost 2–0.

In December 1990 Bishop joined local rivals Chester City for £70,000, making him Chester's record signing until Stuart Rimmer returned to the club the following year. He scored seven times in 19 games to help Chester avoid relegation from Division Three, but he was out of favour the following season and spent time on loan with Crewe Alexandra in the closing stages of the season.

Bishop regained his place in the Chester side and became the first Chester player to score at the Deva Stadium, albeit with a late consolation in a 2–1 defeat to Stockport County on 25 August 1992. Over the next three years he had spells in and out of the side, before a potent start to the 1995–96 season saw him score in the opening five games of the season. He added three more before the end of October, but he was ruled out through injury for the remainder of the season. Bishop (now playing part-time) was released at the end of the season, with his final Football League appearance having been as a substitute in a 3–1 win at Rochdale on 31 October 1995. The season also saw him involved in an unusual incident when out injured during Chester's home win over Hereford United, when he grabbed hold of the public address microphone to criticise the referee as he turned down a Chester penalty appeal.

Bishop returned to Northwich in the summer of 1996, making 54 Conference appearances over the next two seasons. He then moved to local rivals Witton Albion, where he also became part of the coaching staff. He had a spell as joint caretaker manager in 1998–1999,
and in 2001 was appointed manager after another successful stint in caretaker charge. But his reign as permanent boss lasted only 10 games and ended shortly after an incident in a Cheshire Senior Cup tie against Woodley Sports
.

He returned to football as assistant manager to Nigel Gleghorn at Nantwich Town, where he continued his playing days, leaving in the summer of 2002. He then had a spell assisting his former Chester teammate Chris Lightfoot at Runcorn F.C. Halton, with the pair being sacked together in October 2004
.

Personal life
He is the older brother of comedian John Bishop.

Honours
Tranmere Rovers
Football League Division Four runners-up: 1988–89
Football League Trophy: 1990
Football League Division Three play-off finalists: 1989–90
Masters Football: 2009

Chester City
Football League Division Three runner-up: 1993– 94

External links

References

 (Conference playing stats)

1961 births
Living people
English footballers
Footballers from Liverpool
Association football midfielders
English Football League players
National League (English football) players
Winsford United F.C. players
Northwich Victoria F.C. players
Altrincham F.C. players
Runcorn F.C. Halton players
Tranmere Rovers F.C. players
Chester City F.C. players
Crewe Alexandra F.C. players
Witton Albion F.C. players
Nantwich Town F.C. players
Witton Albion F.C. managers
English football managers